Ceramothyrium is a genus of ascomycete fungi in the family Chaetothyriaceae.

References

Eurotiomycetes
Eurotiomycetes genera